...Honor Is All We Know is the eighth studio album by the American punk rock band Rancid, released on October 27, 2014. It is the band's first studio album since Let the Dominoes Fall (2009), and their second one to be recorded under its current incarnation (Tim Armstrong, Lars Frederiksen, Matt Freeman and Branden Steineckert). Work on ...Honor Is All We Know began in 2011 and it was originally planned for a 2012 release, but was repeatedly delayed while the band continued touring and writing new material, and its members were busy with their own projects. After three years of writing and recording, the album was finished in 2014. ...Honor is all We Know is Rancid's shortest studio album; at under 33 minutes, it is a-minute-and-a-half shorter than their 1993 self-titled debut album.

Background and recording
Rancid began work on ...Honor Is All We Know as early as 2011. Asked in August 2010 if Rancid was going to release an eighth studio album anytime soon, bassist Matt Freeman replied, "We haven't really figured that out yet. We're not going anywhere [Laughs]. We're going to do something, we just don't know what it is yet. We're always together and we all talk everyday. We're just doing different stuff right now." On May 27, 2011, Rancid announced that they would do a small US tour supporting Blink-182 from August 25 through September 4, 2011, to enable them to warm up before entering the studio in September to begin recording their eighth studio album with producer Brett Gurewitz. They announced that they would embark on a 20th anniversary world tour in 2012 to accompany the album. However, the album did not arrive in 2012, and frontman Tim Armstrong stated that it would be released after Transplants' third album In a Warzone.

On February 6, 2013, Rancid uploaded a picture to their Facebook page of the band in the studio with the caption, "Recording has begun." Branden also noted on his Instagram page that recording was completed in March 2013, but did not explain the reason for the release delay. In a December 2013 interview on Reddit, drummer Branden Steineckert revealed that the eighth Rancid studio album was called ...Honor Is All We Know, and would be released in early 2014.

The track listing and artwork for ...Honor Is All We Know were revealed on September 28, 2014, and on the day after, Rancid announced that the album would be released on October 27, 2014. Armstrong originally recorded the title track as part of his side project Tim Timebomb.

On September 30, 2014, Rancid released a performance video of "Collision Course", "Honor Is All We Know" and "Evil's My Friend". The band started to preview the album's songs through their website a few days later with the release of "Face Up", "Already Dead" and "Diabolical", which followed over a week later.

The album includes a cover of "Everybody Suffering" by Laurel Aitken and retitled "Everybody's Sufferin'." This is the first cover the band has released on a full length since they covered "Get Out of My Way" by The Uptones on their debut LP. "Everybody's Sufferin'" is mis-credited as being written by Rancid in the liner notes.

Track listing

Bonus tracks

Personnel
Rancid
Tim Armstrong – lead vocals, guitars, mixer (credited as Tim Timebomb)
Lars Frederiksen – guitars, lead and backing vocals
Matt Freeman – bass guitar, backing and lead vocals
Branden Steineckert – drums, percussion

Additional personnel
Mike McColgan - backing vocals
Skinhead Rob - backing vocals
Chris Hollosy - backing vocals
Kevin Bivona - B3 organ, piano, percussion
Brett Gurewitz – producer, backing vocals
Kevin Bivona – mixer, engineer
Phillip Broussard Jr. - engineer
Jeff Halbert - assistant engineer
Ruff Stewart - studio tech
Bob Ludwig - mastering

Charts

References

Rancid (band) albums
Epitaph Records albums
2014 albums